Karl Emil Georg Gerhard (born Karl Emil Georg Johnson; 14 April 1891 – 22 April 1964) was a Swedish theater director, revue writer and actor. In 1938 he changed his surname to Gerhard and used the pseudonym Karl-Gerhard.

Biography
Karl Emil Georg Johnson was born in Hedvig Eleonora parish in Stockholm, Sweden. He was the son of Frans Emil Jonsson (1861–1917) and Jenny Augusta Jonsdotter (1863–1906). In 1916, he appeared as an actor under the direction of   Hjalmar Selander at the Nya Teatern in Gothenburg. In 1919, he debuted as a couplet singer at the cabaret Fenixpalatset in Stockholm  as successor to Ernst Rolf (1891–1932). For many years, he was an actor in various traveling theater companies.

Through most of his career, he wrote songs and couplets as well as a large number of sketches, dialogues and monologues for performance on the stages of Stockholm and Gothenburg. Many of Karl Gerhard's plays and songs were politically to the left, and during the 1930s and World War II, they contained clear anti-fascist statements. He composed and sang a number of couplet text that sharply criticized the Swedish government's apathy towards Nazi Germany, among these Den ökända hästen från Troja (The Infamous Horse of Troy).

He was married three times: to actresses  Mary Johnson  (1913 to 1920), Valborg Geyron (1922 to 1930) and Brita Werner (1930 to 1936).
He was the father of actor Per Gerhard (1924–2011).

Selected filmography
 Mästerkatten i stövlar (1918) 
 Say It with Music (1929)
 Prov utan värde (1930) 
 Lucky Devils (1932)
 Äktenskapsleken (1935) (also script)
 We Three Debutantes (1953) 
 The Jazz Boy (1958)

References

External links
 
 

1891 births
1964 deaths
20th-century Swedish male singers
20th-century Swedish male actors
Swedish male film actors
Swedish male silent film actors
Swedish songwriters
Singers from Stockholm
Male actors from Stockholm